Shinsui Dam is a dam in the Gunma Prefecture of Japan, completed in 1968.

References 

Dams in Gunma Prefecture
Dams in Saitama Prefecture
Dams completed in 1968